The Baggio Il Gallo is a single place Italian homebuilt aircraft.

Design and development
The Il Gallo "Rooster" is a single place, conventional landing gear-equipped homebuilt with a cantilevered, high-wing configuration. The tractor engine is mounted forward and above the wing in a nacelle leaving and unobstructed wrap around windshield in a configuration similar to a blimp gondola. The prototype flew in Italy at a field at Nervesa della Battaglia in December 2011 with attention needed to prevent nosing over with full power. The lack of a horizon line was mitigated with tape lines on the windshield to simulate a horizon. The prototype was demonstrated with a Giuliano Basso rooster paint scheme, with the engine fairing as a head and an ornamental comb mounted on top.

Specifications (Il Gallo)

References

External links
Video of first flight

Homebuilt aircraft